Nordlia is a village in Østre Toten Municipality in Innlandet county, Norway. Nordlien Church is located in the village.

References

Østre Toten
Villages in Innlandet